Olba can refer to :

 The town of Olba, Spain
 Olba, a Roman Catholic see in the former Roman province of Isauria, in present Turkey
 The ICAO Code for the Beirut airport, Rafic Hariri International Airport